Binzhou railway station is a railway station in Bincheng District, Binzhou, Shandong, China.

History 
The station opened with the Dezhou–Dajiawa railway on 28 September 2015.

References 

Railway stations in Shandong
Railway stations in China opened in 2015